USS Cahto (YT/YTB-215) was the lead ship of the Cahto-class large harbor tug in the service of the United States Navy.

Construction
Cahto (YT-215) was laid down by W. A. Robinson, Inc., at Ipswich, Massachusetts,  and reclassified a large harbor tug YTB-215 on 15 May 1944.

Service history
Cahto was placed in service on 1 June, for duty in the 3rd Naval District. She remained in operation there until 5 July 1956, when she was transferred to the 6th Naval District, remaining active until her disposal on 6 May 1957.

Cahto was commanded by Ensign James Edward Hair, in 1944–1945, who was one of the "Golden Thirteen", the first African-American commissioned officers in the US Navy.

References

Bibliography

External links

 

Tugs of the United States Navy
Ships built in Ipswich, Massachusetts
1944 ships